In geometry, a hyperplane is a subspace whose dimension is one less than that of its ambient space.  For example, if a space is 3-dimensional then its hyperplanes are the 2-dimensional planes, while if the space is 2-dimensional, its hyperplanes are the 1-dimensional lines.  This notion can be used in any general space in which the concept of the dimension of a subspace is defined.

In different settings, hyperplanes may have different properties.  For instance, a hyperplane of an -dimensional affine space is a flat subset with dimension  and it separates the space into two half spaces. While a hyperplane of an -dimensional projective space does not have this property.

Technical description 
In geometry, a hyperplane of an n-dimensional space V is a subspace of dimension n − 1, or equivalently, of codimension 1 in V. The space V may be a Euclidean space or more generally an affine space, or a vector space or a projective space, and the notion of hyperplane varies correspondingly since the definition of subspace differs in these settings; in all cases however, any hyperplane can be given in coordinates as the solution of a single (due to the "codimension 1" constraint) algebraic equation of degree 1. 

If V is a vector space, one distinguishes "vector hyperplanes" (which are linear subspaces, and therefore must pass through the origin) and "affine hyperplanes" (which need not pass through the origin; they can be obtained by translation of a vector hyperplane). A hyperplane in a Euclidean space separates that space into two half spaces, and defines a reflection that fixes the hyperplane and interchanges those two half spaces.

Special types of hyperplanes
Several specific types of hyperplanes are defined with properties that are well suited for particular purposes. Some of these specializations are described here.

Affine hyperplanes 

An affine hyperplane is  an affine subspace of codimension 1 in an affine space.

In the case of a real affine space, in other words when the coordinates are real numbers, this affine space separates the space into two half-spaces, which are the connected components of the complement of the hyperplane, and are given by the inequalities

and

As an example, a point is a hyperplane in 1-dimensional space, a line is a hyperplane in 2-dimensional space, and a plane is a hyperplane in 3-dimensional space. A line in 3-dimensional space is not a hyperplane, and does not separate the space into two parts (the complement of such a line is connected).

Any hyperplane of a Euclidean space has exactly two unit normal vectors.

Affine hyperplanes are used to define decision boundaries in many machine learning algorithms such as linear-combination (oblique) decision trees, and perceptrons.

Vector hyperplanes 

In a vector space, a vector hyperplane is a subspace of codimension 1, only possibly shifted from the origin by a vector, in which case it is referred to as a flat. Such a hyperplane is the solution of a single linear equation.

Projective hyperplanes
Projective hyperplanes, are used in projective geometry.  A projective subspace is a set of points with the property that for any two points of the set, all the points on the line determined by the two points are contained in the set. Projective geometry can be viewed as affine geometry with vanishing points (points at infinity) added.  An affine hyperplane together with the associated points at infinity forms a projective hyperplane.  One special case of a projective hyperplane is the infinite or ideal hyperplane, which is defined with the set of all points at infinity.

In  projective space, a hyperplane does not divide the space into two parts; rather, it takes two hyperplanes to separate points and divide up the space.  The reason for this is that the space essentially "wraps around" so that both sides of a lone hyperplane are connected to each other.

Applications
In convex geometry, two disjoint convex sets in n-dimensional Euclidean space are separated by a hyperplane, a result called the hyperplane separation theorem.

In machine learning, hyperplanes are a key tool to create support vector machines for such tasks as computer vision and natural language processing.

The datapoint and its predicted value via a linear model is a hyperplane.

Dihedral angles 

The dihedral angle between two non-parallel hyperplanes of a Euclidean space is the angle between the corresponding normal vectors. The product of the transformations in the two hyperplanes is a rotation whose axis is the subspace of codimension 2 obtained by intersecting the hyperplanes, and whose angle is twice the angle between the hyperplanes.

Support hyperplanes
The intersection of P and H is defined to be a "face" of the polyhedron. The theory of polyhedra and the dimension of the faces are analyzed by looking at these intersections involving hyperplanes.

See also
 Hypersurface
 Decision boundary
 Ham sandwich theorem
 Arrangement of hyperplanes
 Supporting hyperplane theorem

References

 
 Charles W. Curtis (1968) Linear Algebra, page 62, Allyn & Bacon, Boston.
 Heinrich Guggenheimer (1977) Applicable Geometry, page 7, Krieger, Huntington  .
 Victor V. Prasolov & VM Tikhomirov (1997,2001) Geometry, page 22, volume 200 in Translations of Mathematical Monographs, American Mathematical Society, Providence  .

External links 

Euclidean geometry
Affine geometry
Linear algebra
Projective geometry
Multi-dimensional geometry